Philautus namdaphaensis is a species of frog in the family Rhacophoridae.
It is found in India and possibly Myanmar.
Its natural habitats are subtropical or tropical moist lowland forests and subtropical or tropical moist shrubland.
It is threatened by habitat loss.

References

Namdaphaensis
Frogs of India
Amphibians described in 1985
Taxonomy articles created by Polbot